Damini Kanwal Shetty is an Indian film producer, writer and actress.  She acted in serials like Parampara, Alif Laila and played Yashoda’s role in famous Indian TV show Shri Krishna in 1993 which was telecasted in DD National. Presently she is running production house named 'Eternal Flame Productions'.

Career 
Shetty has started her career from theater; she joined theater named 'Drikshravan' at her schooling stage.

Filmography

As actress

Producer

Director

Writer

References

External links
 

Living people
Indian television actresses
Indian film actresses
Year of birth missing (living people)